The 1962–63 season was Leicester City's 58th season in the Football League and their 20th (non-consecutive) season in the first tier of English football. Under the management of Matt Gillies and starring players Gordon Banks, Frank McLintock and Dave Gibson, Leicester sensationally chased the double. After losing 3–1 to Manchester United in the FA Cup Final and gaining just one win from their final nine league games their double challenge collapsed and the Foxes eventually finished in a disappointing fourth position in the league.

Overview
The horrendous winter of 1962–63 was the coldest winter of the 20th century in England and Wales and saw a plethora of games being called off: there was no First Division match played in England during January 1963 and Leicester did not play a game between Boxing Day 1962 and 9 February 1963.

As games began to start being played again after the lengthy hiatus, Leicester, on the icy pitches, began to gain huge momentum and went on a lengthy winning and unbeaten run which saw them top the table with nine (and later five) games to go and reach the 1963 FA Cup Final. However, as injuries took hold and the ice began to melt Leicester's momentum faded and they ended up winning just one of their final nine league games and losing the FA Cup final to Manchester United despite being hot favourites, after a dour performance. Though they were chasing the double during the icy period, as the season came to a close the Foxes ended in a disappointing fourth position and as FA Cup runners-up.

Between 10 November 1962 and 8 April 1963, Leicester went on a run of 18 matches unbeaten, earning themselves the nickname "the ice kings" and creating a club record which stood for 46 years, until it was beaten in the 2008–09 season, though Leicester were in a division two tiers lower than that of the 1962-63 side. Their run of seven consecutive league wins between 9 February 1963 and 9 March 1963 was a club record which stood until 8 December 2019 when Brendan Rogers' side won their eight consecutive Premier League game.

Players
Leicester's creative attack was built around the skillful playmaker Dave Gibson who forged a deadly partnership on the left of Leicester's attack with Mike Stringfellow. Ken Keyworth was the club's centre forward and prolific goalscorer upfront, while Howard Riley provided balance on the right-wing. Much of the flexibility in the side came from the athleticism of Frank McLintock and Graham Cross, who regularly changed positions during games which Gillies said "utterly confused [the] opposition" as opposition players would often be asked to mark "our [Leicester's] number eight, so they thought Cross was their man, when McLintock had replaced him" as "players hadn't got beyond thinking about numbers then."

In defence, Leicester forged a fearsome half-back line of McLintock, Ian King and club captain Colin Appleton with John Sjoberg and Richie Norman as full-backs and legendary goalkeeper Gordon Banks in goal.

Influence on English football
The Ice Kings were managed by Matt Gillies and his assistant Bert Johnson and were hugely influential in English football for their fluid "switch" and "whirl" systems and playing sequences of short probing passes to unlock defences and establishing the concept of positional flexibility and for their switching of positions, particularly of inside right and right-half Graham Cross and Frank McLintock, upsetting the tradition 1-11 formations in England and confusing opposition players, who were used to thinking in terms of rigid formations in the English game. Johnson had brought back this system from watching the great Hungary and Austria sides of the 1950s and he and Gillies developed their own version of the systems with Leicester.

Gillies later said it "confused opposition" as opposition players would often be asked to mark "our [Leicester's] number eight, so they thought Cross was their man, when McLintock had replaced him" as "players hadn't got beyond thinking about numbers then."

Results

Football League First Division
Leicester City scores given first

FA Cup
Leicester City scores given first

Football League Cup
Leicester City scores given first

First Division statistics

First Division table

Pld = Matches played; W = Matches won; D = Matches drawn; L = Matches lost; F = Goals for; A = Goals against; GA = Goal average; Pts = Points

Club statistics
All data from: Dave Smith and Paul Taylor, Of Fossils and Foxes: The Official Definitive History of Leicester City Football Club (2001)

Appearances

Starting XI
The following players have been named in the most starting line-ups. This line-up may differ from the list of players with most appearances.

Top goalscorers

References

Leicester City F.C. seasons
Leicester City